Giovanni Francesco de Orsini  was a Roman Catholic prelate who served as Bishop of Bitonto (1501–1517).

Biography
On 20 December 1501, Giovanni Battista Orsini was appointed during the papacy of Pope Alexander VI as Bishop of Bitonto He served as Bishop of Bitonto until his resignation in 1517 replacing his uncle, Cardinal Giovanni Battista Orsini, who served as administrator. Some sources list his name as Giovanni Battista Orsini, iuniore (the junior), the name of his uncle.

References

External links and additional sources
 (for Chronology of Bishops)
 (for Chronology of Bishops)

16th-century Italian Roman Catholic bishops
Bishops appointed by Pope Alexander VI
Bishops of Bitonto